The Catalan Agreement of Progress, rebranded as Agreement for Catalonia Progress ( in 2011, was a union of center-left and left wing political parties in Catalonia. The union consisted of three parties: Socialists' Party of Catalonia (PSC–PSOE), Initiative for Catalonia Greens (ICV) and United and Alternative Left (EUiA). Between 2000 and 2011, Republican Left of Catalonia (ERC) was also part of the coalition.

History
The union was founded before the Spanish general election, 2000 by four left wing and Catalan political parties in Catalonia. The union is only represented in the Spanish Senate.

Composition

2000 general election

2004 and 2008 general elections

2011 general election

Electoral performance

Senate

See also
List of political parties in Catalonia
Spanish Senate

Socialist parties in Catalonia